Mahmoud Vahidnia (born 1989 in Tehran) is an Iranian philosopher and PhD candidate of philosophy at Shahid Beheshti University.

Life
Vahidnia received his BSc in mathematics from Sharif University of Technology and his MA in philosophy from Shahid Beheshti University. 
He won a gold medal at the Iranian Mathematical Olympiad in 2007. He is also a winner of the silver medal in national computer Olympiad in Iran. Although some media reported he was the "international mathematics Olympiad winner", he didn't compete at any international mathematics Olympiads.

Criticism of Iranian Supreme Leader
Vahidnia got significant media attention when he was a student in the Department of Mathematics at Sharif University of Technology for his face-to-face criticism of Iran's supreme leader on October 28, 2009, during a meeting between Ali Khamenei and students. During this meeting, Khamenei was challenged by Vahidnia in what was called "an unusual encounter". The event was being broadcast by Iranian state-run TV. That made the authorities stop airing the programme.

Citations
On October 28, 2009, during the annual meeting of Tehran intellectual elites with the Supreme Leader, in Tehran University, Vahidinia spoke for 20 minutes without interruptions, critiquing the status of ignorant idol in a golden cage of the Supreme ayatollah Khamenei. Some time before, Khamenei had announced that "Contestation of the 12 June vote is the worst crime possible". The Iranian state-run TV stopped the broadcasting, but the audience's cellphones managed to record the full speech. Mahmoud asked: "I want to ask you something: why does nobody in this country dare to criticize you? Do you think that you never make mistakes? Isn't this ignorance? You have been changed into a kind of inaccessible idol that nobody can criticize. I don't understand why everybody is forbidden to criticize your choices.".

Structure of the speech
Vahidnia classified his criticism in four parts: 
 State-run TV: IRIB (Islamic Republic of Iran Broadcasting) for trying to show a reverse image of what is happening in Iran after June 12, 2009, election and destroying the figures that people trust. He brought up that since the head of IRIB is selected by the Supreme Leader, Ali Khamenei, Khamenei is either unaware of what is happening in an organization under his control or he has direct control and is responsible for their programs.
 Freedom of speech: intelligence-based atmosphere ruling the media and press and brought up the issues that critical newspapers have been facing. He asked for an end to closure of press offices and demanded freedom of the press even when they criticize the supreme leader.
 Supreme leader is criticize-able: Lack of openness in society so that people and intellectuals could freely criticize the supreme leader since the supreme leader, like anyone else, is prone to making mistakes. In his speech, Vahidnia mentioned that the ones around the supreme leader are making an idol.
 Organization of power: Cycle of power in the Islamic Republic and the structure of Guardian Council and Assembly of Experts.

See also
 Ahmad Zeidabadi
2009 Iranian election protests

References

External links
 fa: BBC Mahmod Vahid nia- official TV report.

Living people
21st-century Iranian philosophers
Sharif University of Technology alumni
Shahid Beheshti University alumni
1989 births